Roman Voloshenko (born May 12, 1986) is a Belarusian-born Russian retired professional ice hockey left winger.

Though born in Brest, Belarus, Voloshenko represented Russia at under-18 and under-20 level. He began his professional career with Krylya Sovetov Moscow in 2001. He was drafted by the Minnesota Wild in the 2004 NHL Entry Draft with the 42nd overall pick in the second round. He then moved to the United States in 2005 and skated for the Wild's AHL farm club the Houston Aeros for two seasons before returning to Russia in 2007.

Career statistics

Regular season and playoffs

International

References

External links 
 
 RussianProspects.com Roman Voloshenko Profile

1986 births
HC Dynamo Moscow players
Houston Aeros (1994–2013) players
Krylya Sovetov Moscow players
HC Kuban players
Living people
Minnesota Wild draft picks
Molot-Prikamye Perm players
HC MVD players
Sportspeople from Brest, Belarus
Rubin Tyumen players
Russian ice hockey left wingers
PSK Sakhalin players